Edward John Sampson (born 1935), is a male former athlete who competed for England.

Athletics career
He represented England and won a silver medal in the 4 x 440 yard relay at the 1958 British Empire and Commonwealth Games in Cardiff, Wales.
He obtained the English Native 440yards record in a heat of that event at the Empire and Commonwealth games Cardiff arms park on 22 July 1958 in a time of 46.8 seconds, and was the first British athlete to run below 47seconds for that event. (added by Ted Sampson 26.10.2020)

References

1935 births
English male sprinters
Commonwealth Games medallists in athletics
Commonwealth Games silver medallists for England
Athletes (track and field) at the 1958 British Empire and Commonwealth Games
Living people
Medallists at the 1958 British Empire and Commonwealth Games